Anthony Vivian Inglis (14 April 1911 – 25 September 1997)  was an Irish-British art director for films. He was nominated for an Academy Award in the category Best Art Direction for the film The Man Who Would Be King. Born in Dublin, Ireland, he died in Camden, London, England.

Selected filmography

1975: The Man Who Would Be King 
1970: The Private Life of Sherlock Holmes 
1965: Voodoo Blood Death 
1964: Das Verrätertor 
1963: Breath of Life 
1963: The Girl Hunters 
1962: The Devil's Agent 
1961: A Question of Suspense 
1961: Murder in Eden 
1961: Enter Inspector Duval 
1961: Johnny Nobody 
1960: Your Money or Your Wife 
1960: The Shakedown (as Anthony Inglis) 
1959: This Other Eden 
1959: Witness in the Dark (as Anthony Inglis) 
1958: The Desperate Men 
1956: Pacific Destiny (as Anthony Inglis) 
1953: Return to Glennascaul (short) 
1951: No Resting Place

References

External links

British art directors
1911 births
1997 deaths
Film people from Dublin (city)
Irish emigrants to the United Kingdom